Kilcoy–Beerwah Road is a continuous  road route in the Moreton Bay and Sunshine Coast local government areas of Queensland, Australia. It is designated as part of State Route 6. It is a state-controlled regional road (number 492). It is part of a route that carries tourist traffic from the New England Highway to the Bruce Highway.

Route description
It then climbs the western slope of the Conondale Range and passes the exit to Maleny–Stanley River Road to the north-west. Next it turns east as it enters , where the name changes to Peachester Road. It continues east through Peachester, crossing the Stanley River, passing the exit to Bald Knob Road to the north and another exit to Commissioners Flat Road to the south-west.

The road then turns south-east, descending the range as it enters , and crosses Old Gympie Road before entering the village. As it enters the village it turns south on a bypass of the Beerwah CBD, leaving Peachester Road which continues east, and resuming its official name. It then turns south-east, crossing Roberts Road at a roundabout, and ends at a four-way intersection with Glass House Mountains Road (Steve Irwin Way). State Route 6 turns north towards , and Roys Road runs east to the Bruce Highway.

Land use along the road is mainly rural.

Road condition
The road is fully sealed, and most of it is two-lane road.  of the road is steeper than 10%, and a further  is between 5 and 10%.

Upgrade project
A project to upgrade the intersection with Old Gympie Road, at a cost of $5.5 million, was completed in August 2021.

History

In 1841 the Archer brothers established Durundur Station along the Stanley River, near where Woodford now stands. In 1877,  were resumed from the Durundur pastoral run and offered for selection on 19 April 1877.

Stanmore pastoral run was established before 1885. In 1912 part of the Stanmore property was subdivided and sold.

Cedarton was originally called Pointon's Pocket, after an early settler. He was a bullocky who harvested large quantities of cedar from the western slopes of the range. By 1905 land in the area was available for selection. Bullocks were still used to take timber to  Woodford for some time before they were replaced by motor trucks. 

The town of Peachester was surveyed in 1888. Early industries included dairying and timber felling.

European settlement at Beerwah began in 1877, with timber cutting and land clearing, followed by fruit growing and other forms of agriculture.

Major intersections
All distances are from Google Maps. The road is within the Moreton Bay and Sunshine Coast local government areas.

See also

 List of road routes in Queensland
 List of numbered roads in Queensland

Notes

References

Roads in Queensland